Erigeron glacialis, the glacial daisy, glacial fleabane, Subalpine fleabane, or wandering fleabane, is a western North American perennial plant in the family Asteraceae.

Erigeron glacialis is native to the mountains of western North America, including Cascades, the Sierra Nevada, and the Rocky Mountains. It has been found from Alaska and Yukon south as far as California, Arizona, and New Mexico.

Erigeron glacialis is a perennial herb up to 70 cm (28 inches) tall, with a thick taproot and spreading by means of underground rhizomes. Leaves are up to 20 cm (8 inches) long, linear-oblanceolate to broadly lanceolate or spatulate. Each stem sometimes produces only 1 flower head, sometimes a group of up to 8. Each head has up to 80 white, blue, pink, or lavender ray florets surrounding numerous yellow disc florets.

It blooms between July and September.

Varieties
Erigeron glacialis var. glacialis - most of species range
Erigeron glacialis var. hirsutus (Cronquist) G.L.Nesom - California, Nevada

References

glacialis
Flora of North America
Plants described in 1840